Lake Shannon is a long, narrow reservoir on the Baker River in Skagit County, Washington in the United States. Located just outside the western boundary of North Cascades National Park, Lake Shannon serves as the lower reservoir for Puget Sound Energy's Baker River Hydroelectric Project.

Before the creation of Lake Shannon, the area was used primarily for fur trapping, logging, and concrete making. The construction of Lower Baker Dam blocked salmon migration in the Baker River. An artificial fish passage system was begun in the 1950s and completed in 1959 after the construction of Upper Baker Dam, located upstream of Lake Shannon. The lake has abundant landlocked kokanee salmon, the by-product of salmon spawning in lake tributaries. Fishing, boating and water skiing are popular recreational activities on the lake.

Description
Less than 1 mile (1.6 km) above its mouth, a  arch dam, the Lower Baker Dam, straddles an extremely tight and narrow gorge to form Lake Shannon, a  lake.

The lake occupies a cleft in the Baker River Valley between a prominent river terrace to the west and a less obvious one on the east. While the west slope directly above the lake is dissected with many canyons, the east slope is smaller and smoother. The lake is surrounded by prominent forested mountains, but the surrounding terrain is not as steep and rugged as the upper watershed.

Near the middle, the lake narrows dramatically as it squeezes between the west shore and a narrow promontory that juts out into the valley. The upper half of the lake is very narrow, and the far upper end protrudes into the Mount Baker-Snoqualmie National Forest. Just above the north end of the lake, the Upper Baker Dam blocks the Baker River once again to form an expanded Baker Lake.

The dominant geographical feature in the area is Mount Baker, which rises  a few miles to the northwest of Lake Shannon. Mount Shuksan, a slightly smaller peak, rises  further to the north-northeast. Aside from the Baker River, some major streams that feed the lake are Thunder Creek (which meets the lake near the promontory that nearly severs it in half) and Sulphur Creek, which flows directly into the lake during high water.

The Baker River Road runs in a northerly direction along the east side of Lake Shannon, while the North Cascades Highway crosses the Baker River just below Lake Shannon.

Dams and facilities

The Lower Baker Dam was constructed in 1925 as the first of two dams that generate power for the Baker River Hydroelectric Project, owned by Puget Sound Energy. The spillways are over the crest, consisting of about twenty-four openings. A penstock diverts water from the lake to a powerhouse on the left bank of the river, which generates 79 MW of power, and returns the water to the river just downstream of the dam. This results in a stretch of river that is nearly dry most of the time. The lake holds  of water at full pool.

Below the Lower Baker Dam, another structure — the "fish passage structure" — exists as the river flows through the town of Concrete. This concrete weir is the first stage in a fish elevator and flume that carries anadromous fish upstream to Baker Lake, where they are released into the water and allowed to swim upstream to the Baker River's remaining spawning grounds.

History

Prior to the construction of the Baker River project, Lake Shannon did not exist and Baker Lake was a smaller lake formed by a glacial moraine. Anadromous fish would migrate up the Baker in numbers of up to 20,000 each spring. In the 19th century, the Baker River area was primarily used for the timber industry. Large deposits of lime around the mouth of the Baker River were taken advantage of by a cement plant built in present-day Concrete.

On April 1, 1924, the Lower Baker Dam was official begun by the Stone & Webster Company, in a site known as Eden Canyon. At first, 150 men worked on the project, which grew to a workforce of 900 by the next year. (The dam was later raised  to its present height.) The filling of the reservoir inundated the first railroad bridge across the river, the Baker River Bridge, a -high wooden trestle. The first power generated at the dam was on November 19, 1925.

The construction of the dam and the forming of the reservoir had serious impacts on the salmon of the Baker River — the dam left only 1 mile (1.6 km) of river accessible to returning salmon. Before the dam was built, in many years, over twenty thousand salmon would return to the river to spawn. Afterwards, the returning population rarely would top 3,000 fish, and decreased even more in the 1980s, culminating in a record low of 99 fish in 1985. A structure was constructed across the lower Baker River below Lake Shannon, and this was originally used to capture returning anadromous fish and in conjunction with a few other facilities, carried fish up into Lake Shannon until 1959, when the system was extended to place the fish in Baker Lake instead.

On July 9, 1959, Upper Baker Dam was completed and the inflow to Lake Shannon became regulated for the first time. A major landslide in 1965 crushed the Lower Baker powerhouse and its two turbines, Units 1 and 2. This new structure was built with a sloped roof to minimize potential damage.

Natural history

One of the most abundant fishes in Lake Shannon is kokanee salmon, but this population is said to differ from true kokanee. True kokanees are established in freshwater, but the kokanees of Lake Shannon may be the by-product of sockeye salmon and coho salmon that spawned in tributaries of the lake — including Sulphur Creek and Thunder Creek — either via natural spawining gravels or artificially constructed ones. Some of the fry escaped the conduits that carry outmigrating young salmon into the lower Baker and the Skagit, establishing a population of kokanee.
There is also a population of bull trout present in the lake.

The Lake Shannon area is dominated by Douglas fir and other coniferous and deciduous woodlands.

Recreation
The lake itself is mostly accessed by following the Baker River Road. Parts of Lake Shannon are within the Mount Baker-Snoqualmie National Forest, which also contains all of Baker Lake. Swimming, boating and water-skiing are available on the lake, and kokanee salmon is abundant. However, the only access to the Lake Shannon boat launch area involves passing through privately owned land.
The lake is open for fishing from the last Saturday of April until the 31st of October in most years.

See also

List of lakes of Washington
Skagit River Hydroelectric Project

References

External links
Skagit River History Photo Gallery

Shannon
Shannon
Protected areas of Skagit County, Washington